David Strachan may refer to:

 David Edgar Strachan (1919–1970), Australian painter
 David P. Strachan, British professor of epidemiology
 David Strachan (bishop) (died 1671), bishop of Brechin, Dundee
 David William Strachan (1877–1958), Canadian politician